HADECS or Highways Agency Digital Enforcement Camera System is a type of speed camera on roads in England, operated by Highways England.

History
The HADECS camera was introduced in 2012. 

HADECS cameras have been introduced to enforce variable speed limits (VSLs) as found commonly on managed motorways - hard shoulder running in peak traffic flows.

Hadecs 3
Hadecs 3 was introduced on the M25 in Kent in April 2014, becoming active on 22 October 2014.

Two manufacturers currently hold HOTA to supply equipment for the HADECS 3 system, those being Redflex Holdings and Dynniq.

References

External links
 BBC January 2015
 Type Approval Orders FOI

Cameras introduced in 2012
2012 establishments in the United Kingdom
Automatic number plate recognition
Speed camera types used in the United Kingdom